Spotsylvania Court House Historic District is a national historic district located at Spotsylvania, Spotsylvania County, Virginia. The district includes 24 contributing buildings in the historic core of Spotsylvania. The principal building is the Spotsylvania Court House, a two-story Roman Revival style brick building built in 1839-1840 and extensively remodeled in 1901. The front facade features a tetrastyle portico in the Tuscan order. Associated with the courthouse is a late 18th-century jail and office and storage buildings erected in the 1930s. Other notable buildings include the Spottswood Inn (c. 1800), Berea Church (1856), Christ Church (1841), Dabney Farm, J.P.H. Crismond House (c. 1904), Harris House, and Cary Crismond House.

It was listed on the National Register of Historic Places in 1983.

References

External links
Spotsylvania County Jail, Spotsylvania, Spotsylvania County, VA: 1 photo at Historic American Buildings Survey

Historic American Buildings Survey in Virginia
Courthouses on the National Register of Historic Places in Virginia
Greek Revival architecture in Virginia
Federal architecture in Virginia
Victorian architecture in Virginia
County courthouses in Virginia
Buildings and structures in Spotsylvania County, Virginia
National Register of Historic Places in Spotsylvania County, Virginia
Historic districts on the National Register of Historic Places in Virginia
Historic districts in Northern Virginia